Statistics of SEGAS Championship in the 1910–11 season.

Overview
Podosferikos Omilos Athinon won the championship.

References

 

Panhellenic Championship seasons
Greece
1910–11 in Greek football